La Unión is a town and municipality located in the Department of Valle del Cauca, Colombia. The town, home to Casa Grajales, the country’s largest wine producer, is known for its grapes.

External links
  La Unión official website

References

Municipalities of Valle del Cauca Department